Undeniable may refer to:

Albums
 Undeniable (AZ album)
 Undeniable (Chipmunks album)
 Undeniable (Raven-Symoné album)
 Undeniable (Hellyeah album) (stylized as Unden!able), released 2016

Songs
 "Undeniable" (Mat Kearney song), from Mat Kearney's second album Nothing Left to Lose
 "Undeniable", a song by Dannii Minogue from her 2007 album Unleashed
 "Undeniable" (Kygo song), 2021 single by Kygo featuring X Ambassadors

Other uses
 Undeniable (TV series), a British television thriller serial
 Undeniable: Evolution and the Science of Creation, a book by Bill Nye